The 2018–19 Abilene Christian Wildcats men's basketball team represents Abilene Christian University during the 2018–19 NCAA Division I men's basketball season. The Wildcats are led by eighth-year head coach Joe Golding and play their home games at the Moody Coliseum in Abilene, Texas as members of the Southland Conference. They finished the season 27-7, 14-4 to finish in 2nd place. In the Southland tournament, they defeated Southeastern Louisiana in the semifinals before beating New Orleans in the final to win the Southland tournament. As a result, they received a automatic bid to the NCAA Tournament where they lost in the first round to Kentucky.

Previous season
The Wildcats finished the 2017–18 season 16–16, 8–10 in Southland play to finish in a three-way tie for eighth place. They failed to qualify for the Southland tournament. They received an invitation to the CollegeInsider.com Tournament where they lost in the first round to Drake.

Roster

Schedule and results
Sources:

|-
!colspan=12 style=| Non-conference regular season

|-
!colspan=9 style=| Southland regular season

|-
!colspan=9 style=| Southland tournament

|-
!colspan=9 style=| NCAA tournament

See also
2018–19 Abilene Christian Wildcats women's basketball team

References

Abilene Christian Wildcats men's basketball seasons
Abilene Christian
Abilene Christian Wildcats basketball
Abilene Christian Wildcats basketball
Abilene Christian